Eve Meyer (born Evelyn Eugene Turner; December 13, 1928 – March 27, 1977) was an American pin-up model, motion picture actress, and film producer. Much of her work was done in conjunction with sexploitation filmmaker Russ Meyer, to whom she was married from 1952 to 1969. She was killed in the Tenerife airport disaster in 1977.

History 

Born Eve Turner in Atlanta, Georgia, Turner was a high-profile pin-up model in the 1950s and was Playboy magazine's Playmate of the Month in June 1955. Her unbilled film debut was in Artists and Models (1955). She worked frequently as a photographic model for Russ Meyer after their marriage, appeared in the film Operation Dames (1959), and took a lead role in Meyer's 1960 exploitation film Eve and the Handyman.

Eve Meyer served as producer, or associate or executive producer, on Meyer's 1960s and early 1970s films, including Beyond the Valley of the Dolls (1970).

Death 

On March 27, 1977, at Los Rodeos Airport in the Canary Islands, Meyer, onboard Pan Am Flight 1736 from New York, was one of 335 passengers killed when KLM Flight 4805 collided with the Pan Am aircraft during take-off. The disaster is the deadliest in aviation history, with 583 total fatalities.

Filmography

Actress 

 Operation Dames (1959) .... Lorry Evering
 Eve and the Handyman (1961) .... Eve/Other roles

Producer 

 Lorna (1964)
 Mudhoney (1965)
 Faster, Pussycat! Kill! Kill! (1965)
 Motorpsycho (1965)
 Mondo Topless (1966)
 Common Law Cabin (1967)
 Good Morning and... Goodbye! (1967)
 Finders Keepers, Lovers Weepers! (1968)
 Vixen! (1968)
 Cherry, Harry & Raquel! (1970)
 Beyond the Valley of the Dolls (1970)
 The Seven Minutes (1971)
 The Jesus Trip (1971)
 Black Snake (1973)

See also 

 List of people in Playboy 1953–1959

References

External links 

 
 
 

1928 births
1977 deaths
American film producers
American film actresses
Actresses from Atlanta
1950s Playboy Playmates
Victims of aviation accidents or incidents in 1977
Victims of aviation accidents or incidents in Spain
20th-century American actresses
20th-century American businesspeople
American women film producers
20th-century American businesswomen